The Genius Sings the Blues is an album by Ray Charles, released in October 1961 on Atlantic Records. The album was his last release for Atlantic, compiling twelve blues songs from various sessions during his tenure for the label. The album showcases Charles's stylistic development with a combination of piano blues, jazz, and southern R&B. The photo for the album cover was taken by renowned photographer Lee Friedlander. The Genius Sings the Blues was reissued in 2003 by Rhino Entertainment with liner notes by Billy Taylor.

Background 
Hailing from Greenville, Florida, Ray Charles assimilated much of the Southern black man's musical heritage with its various blues stories, folk songs, and gospel revelations. Charles studied music at a school for blind children in St. Augustine and developed a characteristic modern jazz style of playing and writing by listening to Art Tatum, Nat "King" Cole, Bud Powell, Oscar Peterson, and other contemporaries who played in the styles fashionable around the time Charles moved to Seattle. He molded many disparate musical elements into a style with unique harmony and traditional rhythmic patterns.

Music 
Jazz composer Billy Taylor further discussed Charles' innovative music and his reaction to hearing it:

The innovation of Ray Charles is presented on this compilation LP. The Blues finds Charles delivering wailing and emotional numbers ("Hard Times", "Night Time Is the Right Time") to uptempo arrangements of country blues ("I'm Movin' On", "Early in the Mornin'"). Covering ground from his first session for Atlantic ("The Midnight Hour") to his last ("I Believe to My Soul"), The Genius Sings the Blues began as a simple cash-in LP after Charles' split from Atlantic Records and ended up as one of Charles' most well-known compilations.

Track listing
All songs written by Ray Charles, except where noted.

Side one
 "Early in the Mornin'" (Dallas Bartley, Leo Hickman, Louis Jordan) – 2:48
 "Hard Times (No One Knows Better Than I)" – 2:56
 "The Midnight Hour" (Sam Sweet) – 3:02
 "(Night Time Is) The Right Time" (Napoleon Brown, Ozzie Cadena, Lew Herman) – 3:25
 "Feelin' Sad" (Guitar Slim) – 2:50
 "Ray's Blues" – 2:55
Side two
"I'm Movin' On" (Hank Snow) – 2:13
 "I Believe to My Soul" – 3:01
 "Nobody Cares" – 2:41
 "Mr. Charles' Blues" – 2:48
 "Some Day Baby" – 3:01
 "I Wonder Who" – 2:46

Personnel

Side 1, Track 1 - Marcus Belgrave, John Hunt (trumpet) David Newman (tenor saxophone) Bennie Crawford (baritone saxophone) Ray Charles (piano, organ, vocals) Edgar Willis (bass) Teagle Fleming (drums). Recorded NYC, October 28, 1958

Side 1, Track 2 - Joe Bridgewater, Riley Webb (trumpet) David Newman (alto, baritone saxophone) Don Wilkerson (tenor saxophone) Ray Charles (piano, vocals) Roosevelt Sheffield (bass) William Peeples (drums). Recorded Miami, FL, April 23, 1955

Side 1, Track 4 - Marcus Belgrave, John Hunt (trumpet) David Newman (tenor saxophone) Bennie Crawford (baritone saxophone) Ray Charles (piano, organ, vocals) Edgar Willis (bass) Teagle Fleming (drums). Recorded NYC, October 28, 1958

Chart history
Album

Notes

References

External links
 Album lyrics at Yahoo! Music

1961 albums
Ray Charles albums
Albums produced by Jerry Wexler
Albums produced by Ahmet Ertegun
Atlantic Records albums
Rhino Entertainment albums